Barachatti is a block (Tehsil) in the Gaya district of Bihar, India. Barachatti contains 141 villages and 13 gram panchayat. Sarwan bazar is the biggest and Nimi is the smallest village of Barachatti. The total population in Barachatti sub-district is 142,534 according to the census during 2011 by Indian Government. There are 72,455 males (51%) and 70,079 females (49%). Jyoti Manjhi is current MLA of Barachatti.Sobh bazaar is the one largest bazar of sabji mandi in bihar.

Location
It is situated 45 km south of district headquarters Gaya and 150 km from the state capital Patna in the north. It is bounded by Chouparan Block towards the east, Itkhori Block towards the south, Fatehpur Block towards the north, Mohanpur Block towards the north. Bodh Gaya City, Gaya City, Sherghati City, Jhumri Tilaiya City are the closest cities.

Transportation

The National Highway 2 Grand Trunk Road from Kolkata to Delhi passes through Barachatti. The nearest railway station is Gaya Junction 47 km from Barachatti, which has trains to major destinations in India. The nearest airport is Gaya International Airport 40 km from Barachatti.

Commerce
Barachatti Bazar (Sanichhar Bazar)
Sarwan Bazar (Mangal Bazar) is among the largest cattle markets in Gaya situated at Barachatti. The Mangal bazaar runs every Tuesday. There are other markets in Barachatti including Sobh Bazzar, (jagarnath vastraly sobh) Bhadhya bazzar and Barachatti market. Balti & Jug market is located at 500 metres from the Barachatti block office.

Education

The literacy rate for the population was 47.52 per cent. Literates were 67,745 of which males were 39,891 and females 27,854. There are 74,789 illiterates in Barachatti block.

References

Cities and towns in Gaya district